Lafutidine (INN) is a second generation histamine H2 receptor antagonist having multimodal mechanism of action and used to treat gastrointestinal disorders.  It is marketed in South Korea, Japan and India.

Medical use
Lafutidine is used to treat gastric ulcers, duodenal ulcers, as well as wounds in the lining of the stomach associated with acute gastritis and acute exacerbation of chronic gastritis.

Adverse effects
Adverse events observed during clinical trials included constipation, diarrhea, drug rash, nausea, vomiting and dizziness.

Mechanism of action
Like other H2 receptor antagonists, lafutidine acts by preventing the secretion of gastric acid. It also activates calcitonin gene-related peptide, resulting in the stimulation of nitric oxide (NO) and regulation of gastric mucosal blood flow, increases somatostatin levels also resulting in less gastric acid secretion, causes the stomach lining to generate more mucin, inhibits neutrophil activation thus preventing injury from inflammation, and blocks the attachment of Helicobacter pylori to gastric cells.

Trade names
It is marketed in Japan as Stogar by UCB and in India as Lafaxid by Zuventus Healthcare. It is also marketed in South Korea as Ildong Lafutidine by Ildong Pharmaceutical Co Ltd.

References

Acetamides
Alkene derivatives
2-Furyl compounds
H2 receptor antagonists
Phenol ethers
1-Piperidinyl compounds
Pyridines